Habib Nasution (born 13 November 1936) is an Indonesian former swimmer. He competed in two events at the 1956 Summer Olympics.

References

External links
 

1936 births
Living people
Indonesian male swimmers
Olympic swimmers of Indonesia
Swimmers at the 1956 Summer Olympics
Sportspeople from Medan
Asian Games medalists in swimming
Asian Games bronze medalists for Indonesia
Swimmers at the 1958 Asian Games
Medalists at the 1958 Asian Games
20th-century Indonesian people